BumRush is a 2011 Canadian film directed by Michel Jetté. BumRush is an independent film that was shot in Montreal in French and English and features Emmanuel Auger in the lead role of L'Kid and Bad News Brown in the role of gang leader Loosecanon. Musician and actor Bad News Brown was murdered soon after the film was shot. The film features some of his musical works. BumRush premiered on Canadian theaters on April 1, 2011.

Plot
BumRush was inspired by real events that happened in Montreal. Bumrush refers to "storming into an establishment." After Montreal police conduct a series of raids against a criminal biker gang and the Italian Mafia, rival street gangs rush in to fill the void. The Kingdom, a bar, sees a new bloody chapter in the Quebec underworld, as the "IB 11" gang conducts a series of attacks on the bar that force the owner to hire five extraordinary men under the leadership of "L'Kid" to confront the gangs.

Cast

References

External links
 
 
 Alo Police: BumRush, le nouveau film de cinéaste Michel Jetté (in French)

2011 films
Films directed by Michel Jetté
French-language Canadian films
Canadian crime drama films
Canadian independent films
2010s Canadian films